Rafael Antonio Salazar Motos (born ), commonly known as Rafael Farina (Rafael Salazar for his composing work), was a singer of Copla and Flamenco. His granddaughter is the pop-singer Tamara.

Biography 
Farina was born in Martinamor, into a Romani family, his father, Antonio Salazar Motos, was a cattle dealer, in Alba de Tormes, Martinamor; his mother was Jesusa Motos. He began his career at the age of six singing in the bars of Barrio Chino in Salamanca, accompanied by his older brother, Rafael Salazar Motos, Calderas de Salamanca, also a singer. In 1949 he obtained some fame participating in a tribute to Juanito Mojama. Previously, he had performed at El Colmao. After joining the company of Concha Piquer, he was able to go on tour throughout Spain and America. In 1952 he participated in the revival of the play "La copla andaluza" at the Pavón Theater in Madrid. In 1956 he managed to premiere his own show and in 1968 he worked with Lola Flores at Arte Español.

Acting career

Farina starred in six Spanish and one Argentinian film:

 Café cantante (1951) with Imperio Argentina
 Aventura para dos (1958), with Carmen Sevilla 
 La copla andaluza (1959)
 Café de chinitas (1960), with Antonio Molina
 Puente de coplas (1965), also with Antonio Molina
 El milagro del cante (1967), with El Príncipe Gitano, Luis Sánchez Polack
 Canciones de nuestra vida (1975)

Discography 

Some of the best known songs popularized by Rafael Farina include:

Death
Rafael Farina died in Madrid on November 21, 1995 at the age of 72, as a result of a myocardial infarction, after undergoing an open heart surgery at the Nuestra Señora de América Clinic in Madrid. He is buried in the cemetery of his hometown, Salamanca.

References

Sources 

 Billboard. United States, Billboard Publishing Company, 1975.
 Jeffery, Keith. The Secret History of MI6. United States, Penguin Press, 2011.
 Ni Shuinear, Sinead, and Leblon, Bernard. Gypsies and Flamenco: The Emergence of the Art of Flamenco in Andalusia. United Kingdom, University of Hertfordshire Press, 2003.
 Fernandez, Manuela Rosado. El Flamenco Vive en Madrid. United States, Palibrio, 2013.
 Screen World. United States, Crown Publishers, 1959.
 Pohren, D. E.. Lives and Legends of Flamenco: A Biographical History. Spain, Society of Spanish Studies; [distribution: H. Howell, La Mesa, Calif., 1964. ISBN 9781463347550
 Filmfacts. United States, n.p, 1958.
 Lorente Rivas, Manuel. Etnografía antropológica del flamenco en Granada. Spain, Universidad de Granada, 2007.
 Gómez, Agustín. De Silverio al "flamenglish": (escuelas del cante). Spain, Universidad de Córdoba, 2004. ISBN 9788478017355
 Santamarina, Antonio, and Heredero, Carlos F.. Biblioteca del cine español: fuentes literarias 1900-2005. Spain, Cátedra, 2010. ISBN 9788437626543
 Burgos, Antonio. Juanito Valderrama: Mi España querida. Spain, Esfera de los Libros, 2002. ISBN 9788497340366
 Lorente Rivas, Manuel. Etnografía antropológica del flamenco en Granada. Spain, Universidad de Granada, 2007.ISBN 9788433839947

External links
 Biography of Rafael Farina at Neonmusic
Rafael Farina at Discogs
Rafael Farina at Musicbrainz

20th-century Spanish male singers
20th-century Spanish singers
1923 births
1995 deaths
Spanish Romani people